John More (died 1583), from Worcester, was an English politician.

He was a Member (MP) of the Parliament of England for Worcester in 1563.

References

Year of birth missing
1583 deaths
Members of the Parliament of England for Worcester
English MPs 1563–1567